Mancozeb is a dithiocarbamate non-systemic agricultural fungicide with multi-site, protective action on contact. It is a combination of two other dithiocarbamates: maneb and zineb. The mixture controls many fungal diseases in a wide range of field crops, fruits, nuts, vegetables, and ornamentals. It is marketed as Penncozeb, Trimanoc, Vondozeb, Dithane, Manzeb, Nemispot, and Manzane. In Canada, a mixture of zoxamide and mancozeb was registered for control of the mildew named Gavel as early as 2008.

Mechanism

Mancozeb reacts with, and inactivates, the sulfhydryl groups of amino acids and enzymes within fungal cells, resulting in disruption of lipid metabolism, respiration, and production of adenosine triphosphate.

Mancozeb is listed under FRAC code M:03 The "M:" refers to Chemicals with Multi-Site Activity.  "M:" FRAC groups are defined as generally considered as a low risk group without any signs of resistance developing to the fungicides.

Toxicology
A major toxicological concern is ethylenethiourea (ETU), an industrial contaminant and a breakdown product of mancozeb and other EBDC pesticides. It has potential to cause goiter, a condition in which the thyroid gland is enlarged and has produced birth defects and cancer in experimental animals. ETU has been classified as a probable human carcinogen by the EPA. Mancozeb has been shown to have significant negative effects on beneficial root fungi - totally preventing spore germination at levels far below recommended dosage levels.

See also
Fungicide use in the United States
Maneb

References

External links 
 

Fungicides
Dithiocarbamates